Growing teratoma syndrome is a rare complication of teratoma that can occur when an immature ovarian germ cell teratoma is treated by chotherapy.

References

External links 

Complications of surgical and medical care
Ovarian cancer
Syndromes